Kathy L. Hinkle is an American politician from Kentucky. She is a Democrat and represented District 96 in the State House from 2019 to 2020.

She lost her seat to Patrick Flannery in the 2020 Kentucky House of Representatives election.

References 

Living people
Democratic Party members of the Kentucky House of Representatives
21st-century American politicians
21st-century American women politicians
Women state legislators in Kentucky
Year of birth missing (living people)
Place of birth missing (living people)